Master 7 FC is a football club based in Vientiane, Laos. They play in the Lao League 1, the top national football league in Laos.

Players

Current squad

Coaching staff

Manager History
  Na Byung Soo 2018-2019
  Catalin Dinu 2020
  Chandalaphone Liepvixay 2022
  Vootthivat Daengsamerkiat 2023-

Continental record

References

Football clubs in Laos